Messezentrum Nuremberg is a convention center located in Nuremberg, Germany, which opened in 1974. It is owned and operated by the NürnbergMesse company. The site features 170,000 m2 of display area that extends over 15 exhibition halls, including Frankenhalle. Notable artists that have performed at the center include Led Zeppelin, AC/DC, Black Sabbath, Rainbow and Genesis.

The center hosts different trade fairs, including the Nuremberg International Toy Fair and SPS - Smart Production Solutions.

References

External links
Official Website

Convention centres in Germany
Buildings and structures in Nuremberg
Music venues in Germany